Tory Harrison (born December 13, 1987) is an American football running back who is currently a free agent. He played his college football at the University of Southern Mississippi.

Early years
Born to Linda Tanner (Harrison), Harrison grew up in Leesburg, Florida, and played high school football at Leesburg High School. Without the help of his parents, Harrison was raised by his aunt. Harrison also has three other siblings.  Harrison was also a member of the basketball and track and field teams. He was named a Florida 4A All-State player in 2005.

College career
Harrison played college football as a running back for the Southern Miss Golden Eagles football team from 2006 to 2009.

Professional football 
After going undrafted in the 2010 NFL Draft, Harrison signed as an undrafted free agent with the Green Bay Packers. Following his release from the Packers, Harrison signed with the Hartford Colonials of the United Football League. In 2012, Harrison signed with the Indoor Football League's Omaha Beef. On April 3, 2017, Harrison was released by the Stampeders.

References

External links
 Southern Mississippi profile

1987 births
Living people
American football running backs
Southern Miss Golden Eagles football players
Hartford Colonials players
Omaha Beef players
Sioux Falls Storm players
Calgary Stampeders players
Players of American football from Florida